"Lovesick" is the sixth single by Dutch singer EliZe. The song is taken from her second album entitled More Than Meets the Eye. The single reached number #31 in the Dutch Top 40 and peaked at #15 in the Dutch Single Top 100. The single had its most success in Bulgaria, where it reached the #1 position in the national Top 40 and stayed there for six weeks.

Track listing
"Lovesick" [Beatfreakz radio edit] – 3:13
"Lovesick" [Beatfreakz club mix] – 5:29
"Lovesick" [8Ball radio edit] – 3:08
"Lovesick" [8Ball club mix] – 5:56

Charts

Personnel
Written by Nanna Martorell and Tony Cornelissen 
Produced by Beatfreakz
Mixed by Robin M
Backing Vocals by EliZe and Nienke van den Berg
Photography by Mike van den Toorn
Artwork by Red Melon
Video directed by Jonathan Weyland

References 

2008 singles
Songs written by Tony Cornelissen
EliZe songs
Spinnin' Records singles